Euxoa heringi is a moth of the family Noctuidae. It is found in Turkey, Israel and central Asia.

Adults are on wing in August to October. There is one generation per year.

External links
 Noctuinae of Israel

Euxoa
Moths of Asia
Moths of the Middle East
Moths described in 1877